Craig Cawthray (born c. 1985) is a professional rugby league footballer who played in the 2000s.

Playing career

Club career
Craig Cawthray made his début for Featherstone Rovers on Saturday 31 March 2007.

References

External links
Stanley Rangers ARLFC - Roll of Honour
Emerging England XIII 18 V 36 France Juniors
Young Lions ready for New Zealand Challenge
BARLA GB Young Lions & Australian Schoolboys Pen Pics

1985 births
Living people
English rugby league players
Featherstone Rovers players
Hunslet R.L.F.C. players
Place of birth missing (living people)
Rugby league props
Rugby league second-rows